The Trethewey Mine is an abandoned silver mine in Cobalt, Ontario, Canada, located northwest of the Coniagas Mine near Sasaginaga Lake. The mine was discovered in May 1903 by William Griffith Trethewey.

References

External links

Tretheway Mine, Cobalt, Coleman Township, Timiskaming District, Ontario, Canada

Silver mines in Canada
Mines in Cobalt, Ontario
Former mines in Ontario